The 1906 Michigan Agricultural Aggies football team represented Michigan Agricultural College (MAC) as an independent during the 1906 college football season. In their fourth year under head coach Chester Brewer, the Aggies compiled a 7–2–2 record and outscored their opponents 195 to 28.

Schedule

References

Michigan Agricultural
Michigan State Spartans football seasons
Michigan Agricultural Aggies football